Belmont is a closed railway station on the Belmont railway line in New South Wales, Australia. The station opened in 1917 and closed on 2 January 1971.

References

Disused regional railway stations in New South Wales
Railway stations in Australia opened in 1917
Railway stations closed in 1971
City of Lake Macquarie